The Shelby County Republican Party (Alabama) is the organization governing the Republican Party in Shelby County, Alabama.

Dominant political party of Shelby County 

At the conclusion of the general election cycle of 2010, and as sustained through the general election of November 2022, of the thirty-eight (38) elected officials with either residency or jurisdiction (or both) in Shelby County, all are Republicans. This number excludes municipal elected officials, which are elected on a non-partisan basis.  Nevertheless, several mayors and city council members among the various municipalities identify themselves as Republicans.

Organization and Governance 

The Shelby County Republican Party is one of the 67 county affiliates of the Alabama Republican Party.  The county party organization is governed by the Shelby County Republican Executive Committee.  Its members are selected in the Republican Primary election once every four years, coinciding with the election of constitutional officers and legislators, with the most recent election cycle being in 2022. The Shelby County Republican Executive Committee is responsible for electing the County Chairman and all other officers, including vice-chairman, Secretary, and Treasurer, who run the day-to-day operations of the party.  All serve on a volunteer basis, without compensation.  Additionally, the officers comprise the Steering Committee, and are joined by four (4) Directors (Finance Director, Research Director, Publicity Director, and Training Director), each appointed by the chairman, and nine (9) Zone Directors, each elected by caucus of the executive committee members from each respective zone, and a Legal Counsel/Parliamentarian, also appointed by the chair.

For the 2022-2026 term, places on the executive committee are described in the following table:

Representation to Alabama Republican Party 

By virtue of the By Laws of the Alabama Republican Party, Shelby County is entitled to eight (8) regular places on the Alabama Republican Executive Committee, along with five (5) bonus members on the Alabama Republican Executive Committee.  As with all 67 counties, the county chairman also, by virtue of that office, holds one (1) place on the Alabama Republican Executive Committee.  The term of office for members of the Committee elected under the primary laws shall begin on the day following the General Election of each gubernatorial election year. The term of office for county chairmen as members of the Committee shall be the same as that member’s term of office as County Chairman.  A county's bonus member or members shall serve for the remainder of the then current State Committee term of office.

The following Republicans from Shelby County serve on the State Executive Committee of the Alabama Republican Party.

Recent history 

Presently in Shelby County, Republicans hold office in all eleven legislative seats in the Alabama Legislature with jurisdiction within the county.  This includes four Alabama Senate seats and seven seats in the Alabama House of Representatives.  Republicans hold office as Probate Judge, Sheriff, Property Tax Commissioner, Superintendent of Education, and Coroner.  All nine seats on the Shelby County Commission, and all five seats on the Shelby County Board of Education, are held by Republicans. In the 18th Judicial Circuit, which comprises solely Shelby County, all four Circuit Judges and both District Judges are Republicans, as are the District Attorney and Circuit Clerk.  Additionally, serving in statewide office with residence in Shelby County are the Secretary of State and Judge on the Alabama Court of Criminal Appeals.  Robert J. Bentley, the 53rd Governor of Alabama, is a native of Shelby County.  Shelby County is part of Alabama's 6th congressional district, and thus the county is represented by a Republican in the United States House of Representatives and, furthermore, both of Alabama's members of the United States Senate are Republicans.  Alabama State Board of Education District 3 and District 6 include Shelby County, and both seats are held by Republicans.

Alabama's 6th congressional district 

Shelby County comprises 28.3% of the registered voters residing in Alabama's 6th congressional district, contributing heavily to "the Reddest District in the Country"  label.  As determined by Cook Political Report, Alabama's 6th District ranks in fifth place of the most solidly-Republican congressional districts in the country with a rating of R+28.

Elected Officials 
The following Republican elected officials are those with either jurisdiction, residency, or both, in Shelby County:

Statewide Elected Officials 
The following Republicans from Shelby County are elected statewide and currently serving in their respective capacities.

Appointed State Officials 
The following Republicans from Shelby County are appointed officials serving statewide in their respective capacities.

Republican National Committee - National Representation 
The following Republicans from Shelby County are serving in their respective capacities nationally.

References

External links 
 
 Alabama Republican Party
 Shelby County Government
 Shelby County Sheriff
 Shelby County District Attorney
 Circuit Clerk's Office

Political parties in Alabama